Diphlebiidae is no longer recognised as a biological family.
It was the name given to a small family of damselflies, the azure damselflies, with species in two genera: Diphlebia and Philoganga.  Diphlebia is found in Australia and  Philoganga is found in Southeast Asia. They are large and thick-bodied damselflies. They rest with their wings spread out. The Diphlebiidae were also known as Philogangidae.

Diphlebiidae is now split:
 The genus Diphlebia is now considered to belong to the family Lestoideidae.
 The genus Philoganga is now considered to belong to the family Philogangidae.

References 

Calopterygoidea